Hannah Claire Betfort (born January 4, 1999) is an American professional soccer player who plays as a defender for National Women's Soccer League (NWSL) club Portland Thorns FC.

Club career 
Betfort was drafted by Portland Thorns FC in 2021.

Honors 
Portland Thorns FC

 NWSL Championship: 2022

References

External links 
 Wake Forest profile
 

1999 births
Living people
American women's soccer players
National Women's Soccer League players
Portland Thorns FC draft picks
Portland Thorns FC players
Wake Forest Demon Deacons women's soccer players
Women's association football defenders